Magic Mike's Last Dance is a 2023 American comedy-drama film directed by Steven Soderbergh, written by Reid Carolin, and produced by Channing Tatum. It is the third installment in the Magic Mike trilogy, following Magic Mike (2012) and Magic Mike XXL (2015). The film stars Channing Tatum as the titular retired male stripper, who leaves Florida for London to help a socialite (Salma Hayek Pinault) produce a stage play.

Originally intended to be digitally released exclusively onto HBO Max, following strong test screenings Warner Bros. Pictures opted to give the film a theatrical release. Magic Mike's Last Dance had its premiere at Miami Beach on January 25, 2023 and was released in the United States on February 10, 2023. The film has grossed $55 million worldwide and received mixed reviews from critics.

Plot

Former male stripper Mike Lane, who lost his furniture business during the COVID-19 pandemic, is now in his forties, still in Miami and a bartender for a catering company. At Maxandra "Max" Mendoza's fundraising event, Mike is recognized by Kim, a lawyer for Max's foundation. Afterward, Mike is asked to speak with Max privately.

Alone, Max says Kim told her about his prowess and asks how much for a lap dance. Mike says he is retired, but ultimately says $60,000 when pushed. Max says $6,000 with no 'happy ending', but during the dance she and Mike give in to passion and sleep together. The next morning, Mike refuses the $6,000, but Max offers him the $60,000 to go to London and the United Kingdom for a month. Mike agrees but only as her boyfriend. She accepts and they travel to London together. Max's ex-husband Roger gave her the Rattigan Theatre in their divorce settlement and she announces the theatrical production presently in place of the play Isabel Ascende will be halted for one month so Mike Lane can choreograph a special dance production. As Mike and Max discuss the logistics of this show she has come up with, her teenage daughter Zadie arrives. Distrustful of him, she explains that her mother tries to reinvent herself every few years.

Auditions for potential dancers are soon underway. An actress from the original show Isabel Ascende shows up, wanting to participate. This inspires them to rethink the new show with elements of the original, so they cast her. Going to dinner with a few of Max's London contacts, Mike feels out of his element. Later on, in the car, when Max moves toward physical intimacy with him and he pulls back, it upsets her. The next day in rehearsal, she is excessively critical of his choreography.

Max and Mike build a temporary extension of the stage, so the show has a much more palpable feel, the City of Westminster threatens sanctions due to alterations to the historical building without prior approval. They persuade the only woman on the board, Edna Eaglebauer, to support the show. As she lives a quiet life alone, they fill her morning bus with the men from the show. Edna gets her own sample, as the 10 men do a flirty, choreographed number just for her benefit. She gives them her seal of approval. Mike and Max argue about the ending of the show. She wants him to personalize it and it finishes with a happy finish. She also would really like him to dance in it, but he reiterates he is retired and will not go on stage. The show gets shut down again, so Max confronts Roger. He reminds her that their separation agreement includes a clause that she does not tarnish his family name.

After Max tells Mike to return to the United States, he gets the keys to the theater through Victor and rehearsals resume secretly. The show is not open to the general public, but rather by invitation only, as Zadie taps into her mothers' contacts. Sunday evening arrives, and Victor and Zadie drag Max out for the show she believed she had shut down, even Roger is invited.

The opening act starts the same as Isabel Ascende, but the protagonist is offered only two possible life choices, marry the rich aristocrat or the poor one with a heart of gold. So, she calls her imaginary friend from her childhood, the unicorn, breaks the fourth wall and then talks about modern feminist ideas about what choices women should be afforded, using a golden mic that drops from above. Then Isabel's male counterparts strip off their formal attire and the other dancers are presented one by one. They have sexier and sexier numbers until the last few, Victor is asked to remove Zadie for the most "adult". After a lap dance number for three of the more mature audience members, Mike's number with a professional dancer is reminiscent of moments shared between him and Max. Once the show is over, Mike finds Max, they kiss, and he says he loves her.

Cast
 Channing Tatum as Mike Lane
 Salma Hayek Pinault as Maxandra Mendoza
 Ayub Khan Din as Victor
 Jemelia George as Zadie Rattigan
 Juliette Motamed as Hannah
 Vicki Pepperdine as Edna Eaglebauer
 Gavin Spokes as Matthew
 Alan Cox as Roger Rattigan
 Caitlin Gerard as Kim
 Christopher Bencomo as Kim's Husband
 Joe Manganiello as Big Dick Ritchie
 Matt Bomer as Ken
 Kevin Nash as Tarzan
 Adam Rodriguez as Tito
 Akilbek Allan as Andry

Development
A sequel, Magic Mike's Last Dance, was announced on November 29, 2021, to be released on HBO Max, with Channing Tatum once again playing Mike Lane and Steven Soderbergh, who directed the first film in the series, returning to direct. Thandiwe Newton was initially cast in an unspecified role but was replaced by Salma Hayek in April 2022. 

In July 2022, Soderbergh announced that there are developments ongoing for additional installments in the franchise for stories centered around other characters unrelated to Mike Lane. In September 2022, it was announced the film would now be released in theatres, receiving a release date of February 10, 2023. 

In November 2022, Gavin Spokes, Caitlin Gerard, Christopher Bencomo, Ayub Khan Din, and Juliette Motamed were revealed as co-stars alongside Tatum and Hayek.

Release
Magic Mike's Last Dance had its world premiere red carpet at the Miami Beach, Florida in January 25, 2023, and theatrically released on February 10, 2023, by Warner Bros. Pictures. It is Soderbergh's first film to be given a full theatrical release since Unsane (2018).  Marketing was largely done with TV spots on Warner Bros. Discovery channels. iSpot estimated that Warner Bros. spent "just under" $9 million on the TV spots.

The film was released for VOD on February 28, 2023 and will be released on Blu-ray and DVD on April 18, 2023.

Reception

Box office 
, Magic Mike's Last Dance has grossed $26 million in the United States and Canada, and $29.5 million in other territories, for a worldwide total of $55.5 million.

In the United States and Canada, Magic Mike's Last Dance was projected to gross $8–10 million from 1,496 theaters in its opening weekend. It made $4.1 million on its first day and a total of $8.2 million in its opening weekend, topping the box office. The film expanded to 3,034 theaters the following weekend, making $5.3 million and finishing in third.

Critical response 
 

Writing for CBC, Eli Glasner said "the love story is limp", but praised Tatum's performance: "If dry humping was an art, Channing Tatum would be Picasso".

Writing for Film Cred, critic Maxance Vincent wrote that "Soderbergh took his time for Magic Mike's Last Dance but satisfyingly concludes the trilogy by having Mike's career ending on a high with his newfound friends and someone who loves him for who he is. Like Ocean's Twelve (and Thirteen), I'm fairly confident that Magic Mike's Last Dance will be reevaluated in a few years as one of Soderbergh's best motion pictures."

References

External links
 
 

2020s American films
2020s English-language films
2020s erotic drama films
2020s road comedy-drama films
2020s sex comedy films
2023 comedy films
2023 drama films
2023 films
Films about the COVID-19 pandemic
American dance films
American erotic drama films
American independent films
American road comedy-drama films
American sequel films
American sex comedy films
American sexploitation films
Comedy-drama films based on actual events
Films about striptease
Films directed by Steven Soderbergh
Films produced by Gregory Jacobs
Male erotic dance
Warner Bros. films